Deepak Tijori (born 28 August 1961) is an Indian film director and actor who works in Bollywood and Gujarati films and is well known for his supporting roles in Aashiqui (1990), Khiladi (1992), Jo Jeeta Wohi Sikandar (1992), Kabhi Haan Kabhi Naa (1994), Anjaam (1994), Ghulam (1998) and Baadshah (1999). He also starred as a lead actor in Pehla Nasha (1993). Tijori started his directing career with Oops! (2003), a film about male strippers. This was followed by Fareb (2005), Khamoshh... Khauff Ki Raat (2005), Tom, Dick, and Harry (2006) and Fox (2009). Thriller at 10 – Fareb, a TV mini-series produced by Tijori won the 2001 Indian Television Academy Awards in the category best mini-series. He directed his latest movie, Do Lafzon Ki Kahani, released in the year 2016.

Early life and career 

Tijori was born in a Sindhi family. He received his college education from Narsee Monjee College in his hometown Mumbai. While in college, Tijori joined an amateur theatre group whose members included Aamir Khan, Ashutosh Gowariker, Paresh Rawal and Vipul Shah. His friends influenced him to pursue a career in film acting, in which during his early career he struggled. He said in an interview with Rediff.com "For three years, I sat outside offices trying to get a word with producers [...] I managed to do some tiny roles, which were very pathetic." He had worked for Cine Blitz magazine and also as a hotel manager.

Acting career 

Tijori's first important role came when Mahesh Bhatt cast him to play the role of protagonist's friend in his romantic drama Aashiqui (1990). The film was a commercial success and his hand gestures in the film were widely copied by the youth of that time. He played minor roles in Afsana Pyar Ka (1991) and Kaun Kare Kurbanie (1991). In the same year, he was cast again by Bhatt to play supporting roles in two of his films; romantic drama Dil Hai Ke Manta Nahin and romantic thriller Sadak. The latter film was loosely based on Martin Scorsese's Taxi Driver (1976) and Tijori played a man who is killed by a pimp after he runs away with one of the prostitutes. In 1992, he featured in Abbas–Mustan's suspense thriller Khiladi alongside Akshay Kumar, Ayesha Jhulka and Sabeeha. Tijori played Boney and was paired with Sabeeha. Khiladi was a commercial success. Tijori's next important role came with the Mansoor Khan-directed coming-of-age sports drama Jo Jeeta Wohi Sikandar alongside Aamir Khan, in which Tijori played the role of Shekhar Malhotra, a successful and arrogant cyclist, who wins the Inter-School Championship every year. Akshay Kumar had auditioned and Milind Soman was signed for Malhotra's role before Tijori played it. Rediff.com ranked Jo Jeeta Wohi Sikandar, ninth in its Bollywood's top 10 college movies list.

Tijori produced and played his only lead role in Gowariker-directed murder mystery Pehla Nasha (1993), alongside Pooja Bhatt and Raveena Tandon. Upon release, the film received poor reviews and failed at the box office. In the same year, he appeared as the antagonist in D Rama Naidu-directed Santaan. Tijori starred alongside Shah Rukh Khan in Kabhi Haan Kabhi Naa and Anjaam (both 1994). The latter one is considered one of the most violent films in Bollywood. In 1995, he starred in another Mahesh Bhatt-directed film Naajayaz. Tijori played a supporting role in action drama Mrityudata (1997) which did not receive favourable reviews from critics. He portrayed supporting characters in Aamir Khan-starrer Ghulam (1998) and the Abbas–Mustan-directed comedy thriller Baadshah. In the latter, he featured as the titular undercover CBI agent.

In the same year, Tijori acted in Mahesh Manjrekar-directed crime drama Vaastav: The Reality (1999) and the Gujarati language film Hu Tu Ne Ramtudi. He played supporting roles in the romantic comedy Dulhan Hum Le Jayenge (2000), Vaastav: The Realitys sequel Hathyar (2002) and Kabir Sadanand-directed comedy Popcorn Khao! Mast Ho Jao (2004). In 2012, he played a police officer in Ram Gopal Varma's action film Department. Tijori had approached Varma for the villain's role but he felt that Tijori's image did not match the character's and refused to give him the role. Tijori changed his look in one month's time and was eventually cast by Varma. The following year, he was cast to play the antagonist in Devang Dholakia-directed Tina and Lolo. He had to lose weight for his role. Tijori stated that he himself "was looking for a change" while referring to his salt-and-pepper look in the film. Dholakia said that he was "looking for a new suave villain" and Tijori suited the role. He featured in the crime thriller Raja Natwarlal (2014) and played the role of a terrorist in the Sadanand-directed comedy Gollu Aur Pappu (2014).

Directorial career 

Tijori made his directorial debut in 2003, with an adult film about male strippers Oops! He was also credited as the producer and the writer. The film was released in two versions – Hindi and English. India Today called Tijori's direction amateurish and termed the film "an example of brave new breed". Oops! did not receive favourable reviews but proved to be a turning point in actress Mink Brar's career. His next directorial venture was Fareb (2005), starring sisters Shilpa Shetty and Shamita Shetty. Like his previous film, Fareb too had troubles with the censor board and was given A certificate implying that it was to be viewed only by adult audience. It received negative reviews. In the same year, he directed the thriller Khamoshh... Khauff Ki Raat featuring Shilpa Shetty, Juhi Chawla, Rakhi Sawant and debutante Kainaaz Perveez. The film received mixed response. The following year Tijori directed the comedy Tom, Dick, and Harry (2006). In a review for India Today, Anupama Chopra called it the year's worst film.

Tijori's thriller Fox starring Arjun Rampal and Sunny Deol was delayed due to production issues. Upon release in September 2009, the film received poor reviews. In the same year it was announced that Tijori would direct a Vikram Bhatt-produced film titled Bhaag Johny. The cast included Muzzamil Ibrahim and 2 new actresses. During the film's shooting, Ibrahim had to leave the film due to his differences with Tijori and subsequently the film was shelved for a brief period. The following year, Bhatt announced that he himself will direct the film, there would be a different lead actor and Tijori would play the role of a Pakistani policeman. Two years later it was reported that Tijori would direct Vikram Bhatt-produced film Love Games. His next directorial was an adult suspense thriller titled Dare You, starring debutante Alisha Khan who was selected after an audition of more than 800 girls. The film's poster was the first of its kind and featured the lead actress showing her middle finger. However, Tijori left the project due to creative differences with the film's producers. In 2013, he directed the film Rock'In Love which featured Hanif Hilal and Sandeepa Dhar in lead role. Do Lafzon Ki Kahani starring Randeep Hooda was Tijori's last directorial project.

Bigg Boss 

He played the role of a housemate in the first season of Bigg Boss, as a replacement for Salil Ankola. Ankola had signed an agreement with Balaji Telefilms, which refrained him from participating or acting in television shows made by other production houses that "directly or indirectly compete with Balaji Telefilms." On the seventh day, the Bombay High Court ordered Ankola to leave the house or face criminal charges. He was replaced by Tijori. During Tijori's stay at the Bigg Boss house, his wife Shivani Tijori sent text messages to her friends, family members and media-persons to help Tijori in getting out of the house. After he was evicted from the show, Tijori said that he would make a film based on the show. Tijori called the show "a laundered reality" but denied that it was scripted.

Television career 

Tijori's production house Tijori Films produced television serials. One of his most popular serials was Rishtey, a turning point in actor Murali Sharma's career. Tijori directed the action sequences in several of his serials. He had also planned to produce 1984 – Black October, a film based on the assassination of Indira Gandhi and the riots that followed, along with Hollywood actors. He had hired a casting director for it. Tijori himself acted in TV serial Bombay Blue and produced thriller serials like Saturday Suspense, Khauff, Dial 100 and X-Zone. Thriller at 10 – Fareb, a TV mini-series produced by Tijori won the 2001 Indian Television Academy Awards in the category best mini-series.

Personal life 

Tijori's wife, Shivani, is a fashion designer. Film director Kabir Sadanand and singer Kunika Lal are his brother-in-law and sister-in-law respectively.

Goregaon's Garden Estate Co-operative Housing Society asked Tijori and his family to vacate their house in November 2012, following complaints from their neighbours. The Tijori family had been living there since 2009. The residents of the building accused them of behaving rudely, not paying charges on time, insulting the society's office bearers and bringing disrepute to them. After a general meeting of the members, the society passed a resolution and sent a notice to Tijori, asking him to vacate his flats within the next 30 days. The resolution was sent to the local registrar. He responded by filing a criminal case against nine members of the society and in October 2014, the registrar gave the decision in his favour. Tijori called the legal proceedings a "long nightmarish battle" and accused the society for charging wrongful maintenance money.

Tijori has featured in an advertisement for Vadilal. He was one of the judges of Miss India Worldwide 2006 and has also hosted the Miss India Worldwide 2009. During the 2002 elections for Municipal Corporation of Delhi, he had campaigned for Indian National Congress.

Filmography

Dubbing roles

Animated films

Television
2006: Bigg Boss 1 
(Contestant) Entered on day 14 & Evicted on Day 50
1998: X Zone (Episode-1)
1985: Idhar Udhar (episode 8) as stranger who helps Sunita in restaurant

Web series

References

External links 

Deepak Tijori at Bollywood Hungama
Collected news and commentary at The Times of India

1961 births
Living people
Indian male film actors
21st-century Indian film directors
Male actors from Mumbai
Film directors from Mumbai
Male actors in Hindi cinema
20th-century Indian male actors
21st-century Indian male actors
Male actors in Gujarati-language films
Bigg Boss (Hindi TV series) contestants